The Eleventh Amendment (Amendment XI) is an amendment to the United States Constitution which was passed by Congress on March 4, 1794, and ratified by the states on February 7, 1795. The Eleventh Amendment restricts the ability of individuals to bring suit against states in federal court.

The Eleventh Amendment was adopted to overrule the Supreme Court's decision in Chisholm v. Georgia (1793). In that case, the Court held that states did not enjoy sovereign immunity from suits made by citizens of other states in federal court. While the Eleventh Amendment established that federal courts do not have the authority to hear cases brought by private parties against a state of which they are not citizens, the Supreme Court has ruled the amendment to apply to all federal suits against states brought by private parties. The Supreme Court has also held that Congress can abrogate state sovereign immunity when using its authority under Section5 of the Fourteenth Amendment. Other recent cases (Torres v. Texas Department of Public Safety, Central Virginia Community College v. Katz, PennEast Pipeline Co. v. New Jersey) have identified further exceptions to the general sovereign immunity of States when Congress acts pursuant to its Article I powers, which have alternatively been referred to as “waivers in the plan of the Convention.” The Supreme Court has also held that federal courts can enjoin state officials from violating federal law.

Text

Background

The Eleventh Amendment was the first Constitutional amendment adopted after the Bill of Rights. The amendment was adopted following the Supreme Court's ruling in Chisholm v. Georgia, . In Chisholm, the Court ruled that federal courts had the authority to hear cases in law and equity brought by private citizens against states and that states did not enjoy sovereign immunity from suits made by citizens of other states in federal court. Thus, the amendment clarified Article III, Section2 of the Constitution, which gives diversity jurisdiction to the judiciary to hear cases "between a state and citizens of another state."

Proposal and ratification

The Eleventh Amendment was proposed by the 3rd Congress on March 4, 1794, when it was approved by the House of Representatives by vote of 81–9, having been previously passed by the Senate, 23–2, on January 14, 17 94. The amendment was ratified by the state legislatures of the following states:
 New York: March 27, 1794
 Rhode Island: March 31, 1794
 Connecticut: May 8, 1794
 New Hampshire: June 16, 1794
 Massachusetts: June 26, 1794
 Vermont: November 9, 1794
 Virginia: November 18, 1794
 Georgia: November 29, 1794
 Kentucky: December 7, 1794
 Maryland: December 26, 1794
 Delaware: January 23, 1795
 North Carolina: February 7, 1795

There were fifteen states at the time; ratification by twelve added the Eleventh Amendment to the Constitution. (South Carolina ratified it on December 4, 1797.)

On January 8, 1798, approximately three years after the Eleventh Amendment's actual adoption, President John Adams stated in a message to Congress that it had been ratified by the necessary number of States and was now a part of the Constitution. New Jersey and Pennsylvania did not take action on the amendment during that era; neither did Tennessee, which had become the 16th State on June 1, 1796. However, on June 25, 2018, the New Jersey Senate adopted Senate Concurrent Resolution No. 75 to symbolically post-ratify the Eleventh Amendment.

Impact

Retroactivity

In Hollingsworth v. Virginia, the Supreme Court held that every pending action brought under Chisholm had to be dismissed because of the amendment's adoption.

Sovereign immunity

The amendment's text does not mention suits brought against a state by its own citizens. However, in Hans v. Louisiana, the Supreme Court ruled that the amendment reflects a broader principle of sovereign immunity. As Justice Anthony Kennedy later stated in Alden v. Maine, :

However, Justice David Souter, writing for a four-Justice dissent in Alden, said the states surrendered their sovereign immunity when they ratified the Constitution. He read the amendment's text as reflecting a narrow form of sovereign immunity that limited only the diversity jurisdiction of the federal courts. He concluded that neither the Eleventh Amendment in particular nor the Constitution in general insulates the states from suits by individuals.

In Principality of Monaco v. Mississippi, the Supreme Court ruled that the amendment immunity also protects states from lawsuits by foreign states in federal courts.

Application to federal law

Although the Eleventh Amendment grants immunity to states from suit for money damages or equitable relief without their consent, in Ex parte Young, the Supreme Court ruled that federal courts may enjoin state officials from violating federal law. In Fitzpatrick v. Bitzer, the Supreme Court ruled that Congress may abrogate state immunity from suit under Section5 of the Fourteenth Amendment. In Central Virginia Community College v. Katz, the Court ruled Article I, Section 8, Clause4 of the Constitution abrogated state immunity in bankruptcy cases. In Lapides v. Board of Regents of University System of Georgia, the Supreme Court ruled that when a state invokes a federal court's removal jurisdiction, it waives the Eleventh Amendment in the removed case.

Territorial application

The United States Court of Appeals for the First Circuit has ruled that Puerto Rico enjoys Eleventh Amendment immunity.

The territories of American Samoa, Guam, Northern Mariana Islands and the Virgin Islands do not enjoy Eleventh Amendment immunity.

See also

Atascadero State Hospital v. Scanlon
Seminole Tribe of Florida v. Florida
Florida Prepaid Postsecondary Education Expense Board v. College Savings Bank

References

External links

CRS Annotated Constitution: Eleventh Amendment
Leaving the Chisholm Trail

Eleventh Amendment to the United States Constitution
Amendments to the United States Constitution
1794 in American politics
3rd United States Congress
State sovereign immunity in the United States
1795 in American law
1795 in American politics